The Frauen DFB-Pokal 2005–06 was the 26th season of the cup competition, Germany's second-most important title in women's football. The first round of the tournament was held on 7 August 2005. In the final which was held in Berlin on 29 April 2006 Turbine Potsdam defeated FFC Frankfurt 2–0, thus claiming their third title. It was the third consecutive final contested between Potsdam and Frankfurt.

1st round

* SpVgg Oberaußem-Fortuna withdrew their team from the competition.

2nd round

All teams from the 2004–05 Bundesliga season entered the competition in this round as well as the best team of the 2. Bundesliga 2004–05, Brauweiler Pulheim.

3rd Round

Quarter-finals

Semi-finals

Final

DFB-Pokal Frauen seasons
Pokal
Fra